is a city in Shiga Prefecture, Japan. , the city had an estimated population of 38,259 in 14761 households and a population density of 150 persons per km².

Geography
Maibara is located in northcentral Shiga Prefecture, on the eastern shore of Lake Biwa, and extending inland to the Ibuki Mountains and the border with Gifu Prefecture. Parts of the city are within the borders of the Biwako Quasi-National Park. Mount Ibuki is in the northeastern part of the prefecture. It is the highest peak in the prefecture. The Anegawa River and Amanogawa River pass through they city. About 70 percent of the city is forest.

Neighboring municipalities 
Shiga Prefecture
Nagahama
Hikone
Taga
Gifu Prefecture
Ōgaki
Ibigawa
Sekigahara

Climate
Maibara has a Humid subtropical climate (Köppen Cfa) characterized by warm summers and cool winters with heavy snowfall.

Demographics
Per Japanese census data, the population of Maibara has seen relatively little fluctuation over the past century.

History 

Maibara is part of ancient  Ōmi Province and the route of the Tōsandō (later the Nakasendō) highway connecting Heian-kyō with the eastern provinces passed through the area. Maibara is home to three former post stations: Banba-juku, Samegai-juku and Kashiwabara-juku, and was the location of a port on Lake Biwa where travelers could shorten their journey by taking  boat to Ōtsu-juku. During the Muromachi and Sengoku periods, the Kyōgoku clan domained most of Ōmi Province from their base in what is now Maibara. Most of the area came under the control of Hikone Domain during the Edo period. 

With the establishment of the modern municipalities system on April 1,1889, the village of Irie was established. It was raised to town status on November 15, 1923, becoming the town of  Maihara. On February 14, 2005 Maihara merged Witt the neighboring towns of Santō and Ibuki (all from Sakata District) and was raised to city status, changing its name from "Maihara" to "Maibara" at that time. The new city name was based on the name of Japan Railways' Maibara Station which many people in Japan knew as a station on the Tōkaidō Shinkansen Line. 

The adjacent town of Ōmi was merged into Maibara on October 1, 2005. Maibara was struck by an F2 tornado on June 29, 2018. The tornado caused major damage to homes and injured 8 people.

Government
Maibara has a mayor-council form of government with a directly elected mayor and a unicameral city council of 18 members. Maibara contributes two members to the Shiga Prefectural Assembly. In terms of national politics, the city is part of Shiga 2nd district of the lower house of the Diet of Japan.

Economy
The economy of Maibara is centered on agriculture and light manufacturing. There are several industrial parks in the city.

Education
Maibara has ten public elementary schools and seven public middle schools operated by the city government. There are two public high schools operated by the Shiga Prefectural Department of Education. The prefecture also operates one special education school for the handicapped.

Transportation

Railway
 JR Tōkai – Tōkaidō Shinkansen
 
 JR Tōkai – Tōkaidō Main Line
  -   -   - 
 JR West – Biwako Line
 
 JR West – Hokuriku Main Line
  - 
 Ohmi Railway – Main Line

Highway
  Meishin Expressway
  Hokuriku Expressway

Local attractions 
 Mount Ibuki — With an elevation of 1,377.4 meters, Mount Ibuki is Shiga Prefecture's tallest mountain and a popular spot for skiing in winter and camping and hiking in the warmer months. A gondola and ski lifts carry visitors to the top which affords fine views of Lake Biwa and the surrounding area. The nearest station is Omi-Nagaoka Station.
 Samegai Trout Farm — Established over a century ago, this is the largest trout farm in Asia and with many ponds. There is a shallow pond where children can try catch (and release) the trout. Riverside restaurants serve fresh trout.
 Nakasendō stage towns — The Nakasendō was an old highway linking Kyoto with Edo (present-day Tokyo). The highway had 67 stages and the three in Shiga were Kashiwabara-juku, Samegai-juku and Banba-juku in Maibara city. Even today, you can see remnants of these stage towns established for highway travelers to lodge and trade.
 Amanogawa River — In June, fireflies come out at night. Parts of the river are designated as a protected areas for fireflies.
 Lake Biwa — The lakeshore road is very scenic on fine days.
 Kamaha Castle ruins,  National Historic Site
Tokugen-in, bodaiji of the Kyōgoku clan, rulers of most of Ōmi province in the Muromachi period, and National Historic Site
Kyōgoku clan ruins, sites related to the Sengoku-period Kyōgoku clan, a National Historic Site

Festivals and events 
 Samegai Baikamo Flowers — Underwater flowers which bloom in Jizogawa River
 Maibara Hikiyama Festival — Parade of ornate floats which have a small stage featuring kabuki performed by children. Early October.

References

External links 

  

Cities in Shiga Prefecture
Maibara, Shiga